Movies is an album by the flugelhornist and composer Franco Ambrosetti which was recorded in 1986 and released on the Enja label the following year.

The album includes music from Porgy and Bess, yellow Submarine, Round Midnight, Star Spangled Rhythm, Lady Sings the Blues, The Magnificent Seven, The Blue Angel, and one of Ambrosetti's own compositions for the film Die Reise.

Reception

The Allmusic review by Scott Yanow stated "When one considers the repertoire -- eight songs from movies ... this recording may not seem to have much potential. But actually, the set list includes four well-known standards and all of the music is transformed into creative and consistently exciting jazz ... and the performances are generally quite memorable. Recommended".

Track listing
 "Summertime" (George Gershwin, DuBose Heyward, Ira Gershwin) – 6:35
 "Yellow Submarine" (John Lennon, Paul McCartney) – 8:35
 "Chan's Song (Never Said)" (Herbie Hancock, Stevie Wonder) – 6:25
 "That Old Black Magic" (Harold Arlen, Johnny Mercer) – 3:00
 "Good Morning Heartache" (Irene Higginbotham, Ervin Drake, and Dan Fisher) – 8:21
 "The Magnificent Seven" (Elmer Bernstein) – 8:07
 "Ich Bin Von Kopf Bis Fuss Auf Liebe Eingestellt (Falling in Love Again)" (Friedrich Hollaender, Sammy Lerner) – 4:04
 "Be a Brave Utopist" (Franco Ambrosetti) – 4:52

Personnel
Franco Ambrosetti – trumpet, flugelhorn
John Scofield – guitar
Geri Allen – piano, synthesizer
Michael Formanek – bass
Daniel Humair – drums
Jerry González – percussion

References

Franco Ambrosetti albums
1987 albums
Enja Records albums
Albums recorded at Van Gelder Studio